The Memphis Wings were a professional ice hockey team in Memphis, Tennessee. They played from 1964–67 in the Central Professional Hockey League. As their name suggested, they were a farm team of the NHL's Detroit Red Wings.

History 
The Red Wings' farm team was originally (in 1963–64) in Indianapolis. An arena explosion in November moved the team to become the Cincinnati Wings. The following season, the team moved into Memphis.

The Wings missed the playoffs in their first two years. In 1966–67, they made it into the semi-final, which they lost in seven games to the Omaha Knights. Attendance in the first year was over 130,000, or over 3,700 a game. In 1966–67, the attendance was about 71,000, or just over 2,000 a game.

In 1967 the team moved to become the Fort Worth Wings. The team was replaced by the Memphis South Stars.

Season-by-season records

Notable players
 Gerry Abel
 Henry Anderson
 Doug Barrie
 Norm Beaudin
 Danny Belisle
 Gary Bergman
 Craig Cameron
 Bryan Campbell
 Dwight Carruthers
 Billy Carter
 Bob Champoux
 Bart Crashley
 Joe Daley
 Bob Falkenberg
 Alex Faulkner
 George Gardner
 Warren Godfrey
 Ron Harris
 Chuck Holmes
 Brent Hughes
 Roger Lafreniere
 Real Lemieux
 Nick Libett
 John MacMillan
 Lou Marcon
 Gary Marsh
 Bert Marshall
 Rick McCann
 Ab McDonald
 Howie Menard
 Butch Paul
 Jimmy Peters, Jr.
 Andre Pronovost
 Pat Quinn
 Doug Roberts
 Dave Rochefort
 Glen Sather
 Sandy Snow
 Irv Spencer
 Vic Stasiuk
 Bob Wall
 Bryan Watson
 Jim Watson

References

Ice hockey teams in Tennessee
Central Professional Hockey League teams
1964 establishments in Tennessee
1967 disestablishments in Tennessee
Wings
Ice hockey clubs established in 1964
Sports clubs disestablished in 1967